Achut Bibi's Mosque and Tomb, also known as Shahi Masjid locally, is a medieval mosque and tomb complex on the bank of Sabarmati river in Dudheshwar, Ahmedabad, India.

History and architecture

Achut [Achhut] Bibi's mosque was built in 1469  by Haji Malik Bahauddin, entitled Imad ul-Mulk, one of Mahmud Begada's (1459-1511) ministers, for his wife Bibi Achut Kuki whose tomb is close by. Very little is known about Bibi Achut Kuki. Possibly she was an important member of royal harem.

The mosque and tomb are enclosed in stone walls. The entrance has two arches and two minarets with Indo-Islamic architecture. Its large enclosure was once adorned by seven minarets, three at the outer and two at the inner entrance, and two on the mosque itself. Except the lower parts of the mosque minarets, all seven were thrown down and destroyed in the 1819 Rann of Kutch earthquake.

The tomb complex of Bibi Achut Kuki is located on the south end of the mosque. It is an open canopy with thirty two pillars and eight domes under which several unmarked tombs are located. The exact tomb of Bibi is not identifiable as flagstones are missing. The tomb and mosque was again damaged in 2001 Gujarat earthquake and was restored by Archaeological Survey of India. The structures are also threatened by encroachments.

References 

Mosques in Ahmedabad
Religious buildings and structures completed in 1469
Monuments of National Importance in Gujarat